The Agape Foundation Fund for Nonviolent Social Change was a non-profit, public foundation which funded "nonviolent social change organizations committed to peace and justice issues." In 2010, the foundation merged with the Peace Development Fund.

History 
Agape Foundation was established in 1969 in Palo Alto, California to finance the activities of organizations opposed to the Vietnam War. Its name, "Agape," was taken from the Greek word meaning "the unselfish love of one person for another." The foundation characterized its founders as "[p]acifists, World War II conscientious objectors, and anti-Vietnam War activists" who sought "to build a movement that seriously challenged the Pentagon and the American culture of violence."

The foundation merged in 2010 with the Peace Development Fund.

Grantmaking 
Agape focused its grantmaking primarily on grassroots organizations in the Western United States. The foundation generally did not make grants exceeding $2,000.

In 2004, the Agape Foundation awarded $1.18 million to 61 grassroots, peace and justice organizations, bringing its 35-year grantmaking total to $8.8 million and its total number of grant recipients to more than 700. By 2009 the foundation had raised more than $13 million and provided funding to over 800 organizations.

Seed grants 
The foundation provided seed grants to new, California-based, peace and justice organizations to help them launch or expand their operations. These recipient groups were typically under five years old and had annual budgets of less than $100,000. Agape also made emergency grants to help such organizations "respond to unforeseen governmental, corporate, environmental or military events."

Recipients 
Some of their grant recipients have included:

Fiscal sponsorship program 
Agape's fiscal sponsorship program allowed donors to make tax-deductible contributions to smaller groups in California who did not have their own tax-exempt status.

References

Nonviolence organizations based in the United States
Political and economic research foundations in the United States
Organizations established in 1969
Non-profit organizations based in San Francisco
Organizations disestablished in 2010